Jim Omerberg was a member of the West Virginia House of Delegates.

Biography
Omberberg was born on July 28, 1894, in La Crosse, Wisconsin. During World War I, he served with the United States Army. He was Presbyterian, and died in Franklin County, Ohio on October 14, 1967.

Political career
Omerberg was a member of the House of Delegates from 1959 to 1960. Previously, he unsuccessfully ran for a seat in the House in 1954. He was a Democrat.

References

Politicians from La Crosse, Wisconsin
Democratic Party members of the West Virginia House of Delegates
Military personnel from Wisconsin
Military personnel from West Virginia
United States Army soldiers
United States Army personnel of World War I
1894 births
1967 deaths
20th-century American politicians
Presbyterians from West Virginia